Dream Well (born 1995 in France) is a retired champion Thoroughbred racehorse, bred by the Niarchos family. Dream Well was purchased at the Agence Francaise Yearling Sale in Deauville by Jean Louis Bouchard. He became best known for winning not only the Prix du Jockey Club (French Derby), but also the Irish Derby Stakes in 1998 – a classic double which until that year was only completed by Assert and Old Vic in the 1980s.

Background
Dream Well's dam was Soul Dream, herself the daughter of the dual Prix de l'Arc de Triomphe winner Alleged. Sired by Champion Sadler's Wells, himself the winner of Irish 2,000 Guineas and the Eclipse Stakes. Dream Well's ancestors through his great grand dam Mia Pola can be traced back to U.S. Triple Crown champion War Admiral, and also his pedigree carries a double cross of world-renowned sire Northern Dancer, through his dam and sire.

Racing career
As a three-year-old, trained by Pascal Bary and ridden by Cash Asmussen, Dream Well won the Prix du Jockey Club (French Derby) on only his fourth ever outing, beating Croco Rouge by ½ length. One month later in magnificent style, quickly leaving his rivals for dead, Dream Well completed the double by winning the Irish Derby and so beating City Honours by 4½ lengths. This led to Dream Well being voted the 1998 Irish Horse of the Year and 1998 European Horse of the Year.

Stud record
Dream Well was retired from racing at the end of the 1999 season and was sent to stud in Japan and, for one season, New Zealand. He returned to France in 2004 to stand at Haras de Fresnay-le-Buffard, where he now stands.

Dream Well now has his own BLOG.

Pedigree

References
 Dream Well's pedigree and racing stats
 Dream Well at Haras de Fresnay-le-Buffard

1995 racehorse births
Racehorses bred in France
Racehorses trained in France
French Thoroughbred Classic Race winners
European Thoroughbred Horse of the Year
Cartier Award winners
Irish Classic Race winners
Thoroughbred family 16-c